Mount Bransfield is a prominent conical-topped, ice-covered mountain,  high, rising  east-southeast of Siffrey Point,  southwest of Cape Dubouzet and  north of Koerner Rock, at the northeast tip of the Antarctic Peninsula.

The peak was discovered by a French expedition, 1837–40, under Captain Jules Dumont d'Urville, who named it for Edward Bransfield, Master, Royal Navy, who circumnavigated and charted the South Shetland Islands in 1820.

References 

Mountains of Trinity Peninsula